Chiang Kai-shek Memorial Hall, secondary station name Nanmen, is a metro station in Taipei, Taiwan served by the Taipei Metro. It is a transfer station for the Tamsui–Xinyi line and Songshan–Xindian line. While the memorial for which the station is named after was embroiled in a naming dispute, the name of the station has remained unchanged.

Station overview

The station is a three-level, underground structure with two island platforms and seven exits. The two platforms are stacked on top of one another, allowing for cross-platform interchange between the Tamsui–Xinyi line and the Songshan–Xindian line. The washrooms are outside the entrance area. The station is situated under Roosevelt Road, between Nanhai Road, Linsen South Road, and Aiguo East Road. It also connects to the Chiang Kai-shek Memorial Hall and some government agencies located around the area.

From 15 November 2014, the station became a transfer station with the Songshan–Xindian line. The Wanda–Zhonghe–Shulin line will serve as the terminus of this station, scheduled to open in 2025.

Public art
The station is home to several public art pieces. By the escalators connecting the two platform levels, a piece titled "Metamorphosis" displays a holographic flight trajectory of a paper plane. Along some of the entrance hallways, "Musical Skies" shows light boxes with images clouds in a blue sky. On the upper platform in "Platform, Stage", elements from Taiwanese folk arts and Chinese opera have been transformed into abstract elements and minimized into two curtains of lines and flat surfaces.

Station layout

Around the station

 Chiang Kai-shek Memorial Hall

 Liberty Square
 National Concert Hall

References

Chiang Kai-shek
Tamsui–Xinyi line stations
Songshan–Xindian line stations
Railway stations opened in 1998
Wanda–Zhonghe–Shulin line stations